Fabrício Werdum (born 30 July 1977) is a Brazilian mixed martial artist and former UFC Heavyweight Champion who competes in the Heavyweight division. He is also a 4-time Brazilian jiu-jitsu world champion, a two-time Abu Dhabi Combat Club World Heavyweight Champion and European jiu-jitsu champion. He holds a black belt in Brazilian jiu-jitsu, Judo, and Muay Thai. Werdum has competed in PRIDE, the UFC, Strikeforce, and Jungle Fight. At the time of his departure from the UFC, Werdum was #14 in the UFC heavyweight rankings.

Early life and education 
Born in Porto Alegre, Werdum started training in Brazilian jiu-jitsu after being choked unconscious with a triangle choke by the  ex-boyfriend  of his girlfriend. He trained with Marcio Corleta at the Porto Alegre Academy, Winner Behring. After success in competitive Brazilian jiu-jitsu and submission grappling, he started his career in MMA. He moved to Spain to join his mother, who had been living in Madrid. As a purple belt, he started teaching the art of Brazilian jiu-jitsu in Madrid and other cities of Spain. Despite only training with white and blue belts, he became a BJJ World Champion, being promoted to the rank of black belt by Master Sylvio Behring three years later.

Mixed martial arts career 
Werdum's early fights were with the promotions Jungle Fight, Millennium Brawl, and World Absolute Fight. He boasted a 4–0–1 record, including a win against BJJ specialist Gabriel Gonzaga. He was Mirko Filipović’s sparring partner at that time and the Croat was the main reason for his debut in PRIDE.

PRIDE Fighting Championships 

In 2005, Werdum made his PRIDE debut against Tom Erikson, winning by submission. Later that year he faced Roman Zentsov in PRIDE Final Conflict 2005, he was able to defeat Zentsov by a triangle choke in 6:01 of the first round. Werdum then had the first loss in his MMA career, when he lost to Sergei Kharitonov via split decision in PRIDE 30. Then in early 2006, Werdum defeated Jon Olav Einemo by unanimous decision in PRIDE 31.

He accumulated a record of 3–1 in PRIDE before entering the 2006 Pride Open Weight Grand Prix. His first match of the tournament was against Dutch fighter Alistair Overeem, and he won via kimura in the second round. He then faced former PRIDE Heavyweight Champion, Antônio Rodrigo Nogueira in the quarter-finals, losing via decision.

Werdum then had a short stint in 2 Hot 2 Handle, facing Alexander Emelianenko in a Heavyweight bout, and beating the Russian by submission via triangle choke armbar combination.

Ultimate Fighting Championship
Fabrício Werdum debuted in the UFC on 21 April 2007 at UFC 70: Nations Collide. He faced former UFC Heavyweight Champion Andrei Arlovski, losing via unanimous decision. He began to train in Brazil at Chute Boxe Academy, becoming more aggressive and showing improvement in his striking, particularly in Muay Thai attacks.

At UFC 80 on 19 January 2008, Werdum met Gabriel Gonzaga in a rematch. Werdum won the bout by TKO. He weathered an early striking onslaught only to secure the Muay Thai clinch and connect with several knee strikes before taking Gonzaga to the ground and finishing him with punches.

Werdum's next fight was against Brandon Vera at UFC 85. He defeated Vera by TKO in the 1st round. Werdum achieved full mount with less than 30 seconds to go in the round and connected with a number of unanswered punches. The decision to stop the bout was booed due to the small amount of time remaining in the round, although the official time of stoppage was 4:40.

In his next fight at UFC 90, Werdum was heavily favored to win but was knocked out in 1:20 of the first round via uppercut by debuting Junior dos Santos. After the loss Werdum's contract was terminated by the UFC. Since Werdum was not contacted directly about the termination he had no idea he had been cut and initially denied the news of him no longer being in the UFC as just a rumor.

Strikeforce
After leaving the UFC Werdum then signed with Strikeforce. He made his debut at Strikeforce: Carano vs. Cyborg on 15 August 2009, against fellow UFC veteran Mike "MAK" Kyle. He won by submission in 1:24 of the first round. Werdum followed that up with a unanimous decision victory over Antônio "Bigfoot" Silva at Strikeforce: Fedor vs. Rogers.

Werdum faced former Pride Heavyweight Champion Fedor Emelianenko on 26 June 2010, at Strikeforce: Fedor vs. Werdum. In an enormous upset victory, Werdum forced Fedor to tap via triangle/armbar 1:09 into the first round. The victory ended Emelianenko's 28-fight unbeaten streak while propelling Werdum's status up the Heavyweight rankings. He was ranked as the third-best Heavyweight in MMA by Sherdog.
The victory over Fedor also gave him the distinction of being the only man to hold victories over both of the Emelianenko brothers.

A rematch with Alistair Overeem took place on 18 June 2011, at Strikeforce: Dallas as part of an eight-man Heavyweight Tournament. Werdum lost to Overeem by unanimous decision (30–27, 30–27, and 29–28). He has received some criticism for "pleading" Overeem to fight him on the ground in order to get into a position favorable to him due to his Brazilian jiu-jitsu background.

Ultimate Fighting Championship return
On 8 November 2011, Werdum made his return to the UFC via contract-signing. It was speculated that his return fight might be against Brendan Schaub, a fight he expressed an interest in. The bout, however, did not materialize.

Instead, for his return match, Werdum faced Roy Nelson at UFC 143 on 4 February 2012. He won the fight via unanimous decision (30–27, 30–27, and 30–27). The back and forth action earned Fight of the Night honors.

Werdum next faced Mike Russow on 23 June 2012, at UFC 147. Werdum won the match against Russow in the first-round via TKO.

Werdum coached opposite Antônio Rodrigo Nogueira on the second season of The Ultimate Fighter: Brazil. The two met in a rematch at the conclusion of the season, on 8 June 2013, at UFC on Fuel TV: Nogueira vs. Werdum. He won the fight via verbal submission due to an armbar in the second round. The victory also gives him the distinction of being the only fighter to hold submission victories over both Fedor Emelianenko and Antônio Rodrigo Nogueira both whom were former PRIDE FC Heavyweight Champions.

Werdum faced Travis Browne at UFC on Fox 11 in a Heavyweight title eliminator bout. Despite being a betting underdog and considered at a disadvantage in terms of striking, Werdum dominated the fight for nearly all five rounds. He won the fight via unanimous decision (49–46, 50–45, and 50–45).

Heavyweight title
On 29 April 2014, the UFC announced that Werdum and heavyweight champion Cain Velasquez had been selected as coaches for the inaugural installment of The Ultimate Fighter: Latin America, with the two expected to face each other on 15 November 2014 at UFC 180.

On 21 October 2014, it was announced that Velasquez pulled out of the bout due to a knee injury. Werdum instead faced Mark Hunt for the interim UFC Heavyweight Championship at UFC 180. Despite being dropped by punches early on, he won the fight via TKO in the second round, becoming the new UFC interim Heavyweight Champion. The win also earned Werdum his first Performance of the Night bonus award.

A rescheduled bout with Velasquez took place on 13 June 2015, at UFC 188 in Mexico City. In a back-and-forth affair, Werdum won the fight in the third round by guillotine choke submission. The win earned Werdum his second consecutive Performance of the Night bonus award. With the victory, Werdum unified the UFC's heavyweight titles and became the undisputed champion. Subsequently, Werdum signed a new, eight-fight contract with the UFC.

Losing the Heavyweight Championship
A rematch with Velasquez was expected to take place on 6 February 2016, at UFC Fight Night 82. However, Velasquez pulled out of the bout due to a back injury on 23 January and was replaced by Stipe Miocic. On the following day, Werdum announced that he was pulling out of the event due to an injury as well. The bout with Miocic was rescheduled and took place on 14 May 2016, at UFC 198. Werdum lost the fight via knockout in the first round after rushing in with an attempted flurry of punches and was caught with a counter right hook, suffering his first defeat since June 2011.

Post-title
Werdum was expected to face Ben Rothwell on 10 September 2016 at UFC 203. However, Rothwell pulled out of the fight on 11 August citing a knee injury and was replaced by former opponent Travis Browne. Werdum won the fight by unanimous decision. After the bout, Travis' coach Edmond Tarverdyan angrily confronted Werdum, who push kicked the coach in the chest and raise his hands to defend himself. This resulted in both fighter corners having to get involved to separate the two men. No disciplinary action was taken against Werdum for the incident.

Werdum was expected to face Cain Velasquez in a rematch at UFC 207 on 30 December 2016. However the Nevada State Athletic Commission failed to approve Velasquez to fight, determining after physical examinations and interviews that he was unfit to compete.

The bout with Ben Rothwell was rescheduled and expected to take place on 13 May 2017 at UFC 211. The bout was canceled due to Rothwell failing a drug test.

A third fight with Alistair Overeem took place on 8 July 2017 at UFC 213. Although coming close to finishing Overeem in the third round, Werdum lost the bout via somewhat controversial majority decision.

Werdum was expected to face Derrick Lewis on 7 October 2017 at UFC 216. However, the day of the event Lewis was unable to fight due to back issues. Werdum agreed to face last-minute replacement Walt Harris on the card. After securing a single leg takedown almost immediately, Werdum quickly secured back mount and transitioned to an armbar for the victory just over a minute into the fight.

Werdum faced Marcin Tybura on 19 November 2017 at UFC Fight Night: Werdum vs. Tybura. He dominated most of the action and won the fight via unanimous decision.

Werdum faced Alexander Volkov on 17 March 2018 at UFC Fight Night 127. He lost the back-and-forth fight via knockout in the fourth round.

USADA suspension
Werdum was expected to face Alexey Oleynik on 15 September 2018 at UFC Fight Night 136. However on 22 May, Fabrício Werdum was flagged for a potential USADA doping violation. In September 2018 it was revealed that the substance in question was trenbolone and as a result he was suspended from competition for 2 years. He was eligible to return in May 2020. Having two fights left in his contract, Werdum announced that he has requested for a release from the UFC. Subsequently, Werdum's 2-year suspension was reduced to 10 months for substantial assistance.

Return from suspension
Werdum was expected to face Alexey Oleynik on 9 May 2020 at UFC 250. However, on April 9, Dana White, the president of UFC announced that this event was postponed and the bout eventually took place on May 9, 2020 at UFC 249. Werdum lost the fight via split decision.

Werdum faced Alexander Gustafsson  on July 26, 2020 at UFC on ESPN 14, the latter making his debut at heavyweight. He won the fight via an armbar submission in round one. This win earned him the Performance of the Night award. After the fight, Werdum chose not to re-sign with the UFC.

Professional Fighters League

On November 16, 2020, Werdum announced he had signed a multi-fight deal with the Professional Fighters League promotion and will compete in the 2021 PFL heavyweight tournament. He made his promotional debut against Team Nogueira fighter Renan Ferreira on May 6, 2021 at PFL 3. He lost the fight via technical knockout in the first round. The loss was surrounded by controversy as replays showed Ferreira tapping out while Werdum had him locked into a triangle choke right before Ferreira finished Werdum. On May 10, the New Jersey State Athletic Control Board announced that Ferreira's TKO win against Werdum was overturned to a no contest due to the controversy of the stoppage.

Werdum was scheduled to face Brandon Sayles on June 25, 2021 at PFL 6. However, it was later announced that Werdum had pulled out due to injuries suffered in his last bout.

Schools and instruction
Until November 2006, Werdum was the Brazilian jiu-jitsu coach to Mirko Filipović and is associated with Team Werdum BJJ Academy, located in Zagreb, Croatia. Through 2008   Werdum was a BJJ head coach in Madrid, Spain for the Barcelo Boxing Gym. Werdum is currently training with Kings MMA.

Werdum currently teaches in Venice, California at his new school Werdum Combat Team.

On 4 October 2015 Werdum signed a contract with Chechen Akhmat Fight Club to represent the club.

Championships and accomplishments

Mixed martial arts
 Ultimate Fighting Championship
 UFC Heavyweight Championship (One time)
 Interim UFC Heavyweight Championship (One time)
 Fight of the Night (One time) vs. Roy Nelson
 Performance of the Night (Three times)
 Strikeforce
 2010 Submission of the Year vs. Fedor Emelianenko on 26 June
 2010 Upset of the Year vs. Fedor Emelianenko on 26 June
 World MMA Awards
 2010 Submission of the Year vs. Fedor Emelianenko at Strikeforce: Fedor vs. Werdum
 Sherdog
 2010 Submission of the Year vs. Fedor Emelianenko on 26 June
 2010 Upset of the Year vs. Fedor Emelianenko on 26 June
 2012 All-Violence Second Team
 Bleacher Report
 2010 Submission of the Year vs. Fedor Emelianenko on 26 June
 2010 Upset of the Year vs. Fedor Emelianenko on 26 June
MMAjunkie.com
2015 June Submission of the Month vs. Cain Velasquez
 MMAFighting
 2010 Submission of the Year vs. Fedor Emelianenko on 26 June
 FIGHT! Magazine
 2010 Upset of the Year vs. Fedor Emelianenko on 26 June
 FightMatrix
 2010 Upset of the Year vs. Fedor Emelianenko on 26 June
 Lineal MMA Heavyweight Champion (two times)

Submission grappling 
 International Brazilian Jiu-Jitsu Federation
 2004 IBJJF World Jiu-Jitsu Championships Black Belt Gold Medalist
 2003 IBJJF World Jiu-Jitsu Championships Black Belt Absolute Bronze Medalist
 2003 IBJJF World Jiu-Jitsu Championships Black Belt Gold Medalist
 2003 Pan American Championships Black Belt Absolute Silver Medalist
 2003 Pan American Championships Black Belt Bronze Medalist
 2002 IBJJF World Jiu-Jitsu Championships Brown Belt Bronze Medalist
 2002 Pan American Championships Brown Belt Gold Medalist
 2001 IBJJF World Jiu-Jitsu Championships Purple Belt Silver Medalist
 2001 Pan American Championships Purple Belt Absolute Gold Medalist
 2001 Pan American Championships Purple Belt Gold Medalist
 2000 IBJJF World Jiu-Jitsu Championships Blue Belt Absolute Gold Medalist
 2000 IBJJF World Jiu-Jitsu Championships Blue Belt Gold Medalist
 2000 Pan American Championships Blue Belt Gold Medalist
 ADCC Submission Wrestling World Championship
 2011 ADCC Submission Wrestling World Championships Silver Medalist
 2009 ADCC Submission Wrestling World Championships Gold Medalist
 2007 ADCC Submission Wrestling World Championships Gold Medalist
 2005 ADCC Submission Wrestling World Championships Bronze Medalist
 2003 ADCC Submission Wrestling World Championships Absolute Bronze Medalist
 2003 ADCC Submission Wrestling World Championships Silver Medalist

Personal life
Werdum has two daughters with his wife Karine. Werdum is fluent in Portuguese, English and Spanish, having lived in Spain for 10 years, and as his mother is of Spanish descent. Werdum was previously a Spanish-language commentator for the UFC and often comes to the octagon with the Spanish flag, as well as the Brazilian one.

From 2004 to 2006, Werdum lived and trained together with Mirko Filipović in Zagreb, Croatia.

In January 2019, Werdum made the news when he and a lifeguard rescued drowning teenagers at a beach near his home in Torrance, California.

Mixed martial arts record

|-
|NC
|align=center|24–9–1 (1)
|Renan Ferreira
|No Contest (overturned)
|PFL 3 
|
|align=center|1
|align=center|2:32
|Atlantic City, New Jersey, United States
|
|-
|Win
|align=center|24–9–1
|Alexander Gustafsson
|Submission (armbar)
|UFC on ESPN: Whittaker vs. Till 
|
|align=center|1
|align=center|2:30
|Abu Dhabi, United Arab Emirates
|
|-
|Loss
|align=center|23–9–1
|Alexey Oleynik
|Decision (split)
|UFC 249
|
|align=center|3
|align=center|5:00
|Jacksonville, Florida, United States
|
|-
|Loss
|align=center|23–8–1
|Alexander Volkov
|KO (punches)
|UFC Fight Night: Werdum vs. Volkov 
|
|align=center|4
|align=center|1:38
|London, England
|
|-
|Win
|align=center|23–7–1
|Marcin Tybura
|Decision (unanimous) 
|UFC Fight Night: Werdum vs. Tybura
|
|align=center|5
|align=center|5:00
|Sydney, Australia
|
|-
|Win
|align=center|22–7–1
|Walt Harris
|Submission (armbar)
|UFC 216 
|
|align=center|1
|align=center|1:05
|Las Vegas, Nevada, United States
|
|-
|Loss
|align=center|21–7–1
|Alistair Overeem
|Decision (majority)
|UFC 213 
|
|align=center|3
|align=center|5:00
|Las Vegas, Nevada, United States
|
|-
|Win
|align=center|21–6–1
|Travis Browne
|Decision (unanimous)
|UFC 203 
|
|align=center|3
|align=center|5:00
|Cleveland, Ohio, United States
|
|-
|Loss
|align=center|20–6–1
|Stipe Miocic
|KO (punch)
|UFC 198
|
|align=center|1
|align=center|2:47
|Curitiba, Brazil
|
|-
|Win
|align=center|20–5–1
|Cain Velasquez 
| Submission (guillotine choke)
|UFC 188 
| 
|align=center|3
|align=center|2:13
|Mexico City, Mexico
|
|-
| Win
| align=center| 19–5–1
| Mark Hunt
| TKO (knee and punches)
| UFC 180
| 
| align=center| 2
| align=center| 2:27
| Mexico City, Mexico
| 
|-
| Win
| align=center| 18–5–1
| Travis Browne
| Decision (unanimous)
| UFC on Fox: Werdum vs. Browne
| 
| align=center| 5
| align=center| 5:00
| Orlando, Florida, United States
| 
|-
| Win
| align=center| 17–5–1
| Antônio Rodrigo Nogueira
| Submission (armbar)
| UFC on Fuel TV: Nogueira vs. Werdum
| 
| align=center| 2
| align=center| 2:41
| Fortaleza, Brazil
| 
|-
| Win
| align=center| 16–5–1
| Mike Russow
| TKO (punches)
| UFC 147
| 
| align=center| 1
| align=center| 2:28
| Belo Horizonte, Brazil
| 
|-
| Win
| align=center| 15–5–1
| Roy Nelson
| Decision (unanimous)
| UFC 143
| 
| align=center| 3
| align=center| 5:00
| Las Vegas, Nevada, United States
| 
|-
| Loss
| align=center| 14–5–1
| Alistair Overeem
| Decision (unanimous)
| Strikeforce: Overeem vs. Werdum
| 
| align=center| 3
| align=center| 5:00
| Dallas, Texas, United States
| 
|-
| Win
| align=center| 14–4–1
| Fedor Emelianenko
| Submission (triangle armbar)
| Strikeforce: Fedor vs. Werdum
| 
| align=center| 1
| align=center| 1:09
| San Jose, California, United States
|
|-
| Win
| align=center| 13–4–1
| Antônio Silva
| Decision (unanimous)
| Strikeforce: Fedor vs. Rogers
| 
| align=center| 3
| align=center| 5:00
| Hoffman Estates, Illinois, United States
| 
|-
| Win
| align=center| 12–4–1
| Mike Kyle
| Submission (guillotine choke)
| Strikeforce: Carano vs. Cyborg
| 
| align=center| 1
| align=center| 1:24
| San Jose, California, United States
| 
|-
| Loss
| align=center| 11–4–1
| Junior dos Santos
| TKO (punches)
| UFC 90
| 
| align=center| 1
| align=center| 1:20
| Rosemont, Illinois, United States
| 
|-
| Win
| align=center| 11–3–1
| Brandon Vera
| TKO (punches)
| UFC 85
| 
| align=center| 1
| align=center| 4:40
| London, England
| 
|-
| Win
| align=center| 
| Gabriel Gonzaga
| TKO (punches)
| UFC 80
| 
| align=center| 2
| align=center| 4:34
| Newcastle upon Tyne, England
| 
|-
| Loss
| align=center| 9–3–1
| Andrei Arlovski
| Decision (unanimous)
| UFC 70
| 
| align=center| 3
| align=center| 5:00
| Manchester, England
| 
|-
| Win
| align=center| 9–2–1
| Alexander Emelianenko
| Submission (arm-triangle choke)
| 2H2H: Pride & Honor
| 
| align=center| 1
| align=center| 3:24
| Rotterdam, Netherlands
| 
|-
| Loss
| align=center| 8–2–1
| Antônio Rodrigo Nogueira
| Decision (unanimous)
| Pride FC - Critical Countdown Absolute
| 
| align=center| 3
| align=center| 5:00
| Saitama, Japan
| 
|-
| Win
| align=center| 8–1–1
| Alistair Overeem
| Submission (kimura)
| Pride FC - Total Elimination Absolute
| 
| align=center| 2
| align=center| 3:43
| Osaka, Japan
| 
|-
| Win
| align=center| 7–1–1
| John-Olav Einemo
| Decision (unanimous)
| Pride 31 - Dreamers
| 
| align=center| 3
| align=center| 5:00
| Saitama, Japan
| 
|-
| Loss
| align=center| 6–1–1
| Sergei Kharitonov
| Decision (split)
| Pride 30
| 
| align=center| 3
| align=center| 5:00
| Saitama, Japan
| 
|-
| Win
| align=center| 6–0–1
| Roman Zentsov
| Submission (triangle armbar)
| Pride Final Conflict 2005
| 
| align=center| 1
| align=center| 6:01
| Saitama, Japan
| 
|-
| Win
| align=center| 5–0–1
| Tom Erikson
| Submission (rear-naked choke)
| Pride 29
| 
| align=center| 1
| align=center| 5:29
| Saitama, Japan
| 
|-
| Win
| align=center| 4–0–1
| Ebenezer Fontes Braga
| KO (punch)
| Jungle Fight 2
| 
| align=center| 2
| align=center| 1:28
| Manaus,  Brazil
| 
|-
| Win
| align=center| 3–0–1
| Gabriel Gonzaga
| TKO (punches)
| Jungle Fight 1
| 
| align=center| 3
| align=center| 2:11
| Manaus,  Brazil
| 
|-
| Win
| align=center| 2–0–1
| Kristof Midoux
| Submission (triangle armbar)
| WAFF 2: World Absolute Fight 2
| 
| align=center| 1
| align=center| 4:11
| Marrakech, Morocco
| 
|-
| Draw
| align=center| 1–0–1
| James Zikic
| Draw
| Millennium Brawl 8
| 
| align=center| 3
| align=center| 5:00
| High Wycombe, England
| 
|-
| Win
| align=center| 1–0
| Tengiz Tedoradze
| Submission (triangle choke)
| Millennium Brawl 7
| 
| align=center| 1
| align=center| N/A
| High Wycombe, England
|
|-

Pay-per-view bouts

See also 
 List of Strikeforce alumni
 List of male mixed martial artists
 List of Brazilian Jiu-Jitsu practitioners

References

External links 

 Fabrício Werdum at PFL
 

|-

1977 births
Living people
Brazilian male mixed martial artists
Heavyweight mixed martial artists
Mixed martial artists utilizing Muay Thai
Mixed martial artists utilizing judo
Mixed martial artists utilizing Brazilian jiu-jitsu
Brazilian male judoka
Brazilian male kickboxers
Brazilian submission wrestlers
Brazilian people of Spanish descent
Brazilian Muay Thai practitioners
Brazilian practitioners of Brazilian jiu-jitsu
Sportspeople from Porto Alegre
Brazilian expatriate sportspeople in Spain
Brazilian expatriate sportspeople in the United States
Brazilian expatriate sportspeople in Croatia
Brazilian expatriates in Russia
People awarded a black belt in Brazilian jiu-jitsu
Ultimate Fighting Championship champions
Doping cases in mixed martial arts
Ultimate Fighting Championship male fighters
World Brazilian Jiu-Jitsu Championship medalists
American people of Brazilian descent
Brazilian jiu-jitsu practitioners who have competed in MMA (men)